P&T may refer to:

 Partitioning and transmutation, a succession of chemical separation operations (advanced reprocessing) and neutron irradiation repeated in long nuclear fuel cycles aimed at reducing the radiotoxicity of minor actinides and long-lived fission products
 Post & Telegraph, former cabinet department of the Government of India 
 Minister for Posts and Telegraphs, former senior government position in Ireland
 Pharmacy and Therapeutics
 Pharmacy and Therapeutics (journal)
 Penn & Teller, American illusionists and entertainers
 P&TLuxembourg, Luxembourg communications corporation
 P & T Architects & Engineers Ltd., an architecture firm in Hong Kong
 Promotion and Tenure, referring to academic tenure processes
 Packaging and testing, semiconductor